The  following is a list of awards and nominations received by American actress and model Dakota Johnson. Among her accolades, she received the Robert Altman Award from the Independent Spirit Awards as a part of the ensemble for Suspiria. She also received a People's Choice Award, as well as nominations for two MTV Movie & TV Awards and the BAFTA Rising Star Award.

Awards and nominations

Alliance of Women Film Journalists

British Academy Film Awards

Central Ohio Film Critics Association

Cinema Con

Elle

Golden Raspberry Awards

Hollywood Critics Association

Hollywood Film Awards

Hollywood Foreign Press Association

Indiana Film Journalists' Association

Film Independent Spirit Awards

MTV Movie & TV Awards

Middleburg Film Festival

Palm Springs International Film Festival

People's Choice Awards

Phoenix Film Critics Society

San Diego Film Critics Society Awards

Washington D.C. Area Film Critics Association

Women Film Critics Circle

Women's Image Network Awards

Young Hollywood Awards

Notes

References

External links
 

Johnson, Dakota